Ataxin 7-like 2 is a protein in humans that is encoded by the ATXN7L2 gene.

References

External links

Further reading 

Human proteins